The 2018 BYU Cougars women's volleyball team represents Brigham Young University in the 2018 NCAA Division I women's volleyball season. The Cougars are led by fourth year head coach Heather Olmstead and play their home games at the Smith Fieldhouse. The Cougars are members of the WCC.

BYU comes off a season where they won the WCC regular season championship and once again participated in the NCAA tournament before falling to Kentucky in the third round.

Season highlights
Roni Jones-Perry won the WCC Player of the Week (Sept. 3) and the AVCA Player of the Week (Sept. 4) awards for her performance during BYU's win over Stanford at the BYU Nike Invitational. Additionally she was the tournament MVP.
The 5,472 attendance against Utah was a record for the highest attendance ever for women's volleyball in the Smith Fieldhouse.
Mary Lake was awarded the #2 play on the SportsCenter Top 10 for the night for her save against Utah.
The 1,137 attendance at Weber State was a record for the highest attendance in Swenson Gym since it was remodeled and made specifically into a volleyball court in 2006.
Lyndie Haddock-Eppich won the WCC player of the week award on Sept. 17 for her performances against Utah and Weber State.
The 2,259 attendance at Portland was a record for the highest volleyball attendance at Chiles Center.
The November 17 game at Pacific was relocated from Stockton due to the California Wildfires causing bad air quality.
Heather Olmstead was voted as the 2018 AVCA Coach of the Year.

Roster

Schedule

 *-Indicates Conference Opponent
 y-Indicates NCAA Playoffs
 Times listed are Mountain Time Zone.

Announcers for televised games
All home games will be on BYUtv or TheW.tv powered by Stadium. All but one road game will also be televised or streamed. The Pacific game was originally scheduled to be streamed on TheW.tv, but a change in venues due to the bad air quality from the California Wildfires cancelled the stream. 
Utah Valley: Spencer Linton, Jarom Jordan, & Jason Shepherd
Duke: Ryan Craig & Emma Paradiso
Duke: Ryan Craig & Emma Paradiso
West Virginia: Mitchell Marshall
Stanford: Spencer Linton, Amy Gant, & Jason Shepherd
Wichita State: Mitchell Marshall
USC: No commentary
Syracuse: No commentary
Marquette: Dan Avington and Zoe Comerford	
Utah: Spencer Linton, Amy Gant, & Jason Shepherd	
Weber State: Brandon Garside	
Pacific: Spencer Linton, Kristen Kozlowski, & Jason Shepherd		
Saint Mary's: Mitchell Marshall
Pepperdine: Paul Sunderland & Holly McPeak
Gonzaga: Mitchell Marshall	
Portland: Spencer Linton, Kristen Kozlowski, & Jason Shepherd	
San Diego: Nick Rice
San Francisco:	Joe Hallisy
Santa Clara: Anthony Passarelli	
Loyola Marymount: Spencer Linton, Kristen Kozlowski, & Jason Shepherd		
Pepperdine: Spencer Linton, Kristen Kozlowski, & Jason Shepherd		
Portland: Tom Kolker & Laura Humphrey
Gonzaga: No commentary
San Diego: Spencer Linton & Kristen Kozlowski
Santa Clara: Spencer Linton & Kristen Kozlowski
San Francisco:	Robbie Bullough
Saint Mary's: Alex Jensen & Andy Schroeder
Loyola Marymount: Max O'Neill
Stony Brook: Spencer Linton, Kristen Kozlowski, & Jason Shepherd
Utah: Spencer Linton & Kristen Kozlowski
Florida: Sam Gore & Dain Blanton
Texas: Sam Gore & Dain Blanton
Semifinal: Paul Sunderland, Karch Kiraly, & Holly Rowe

References
For information on BYU's other fall and winter sports please check out the following:

2018 team
2018 in sports in Utah
BYU